The 2016–17 UMBC Retrievers women's basketball team represented the University of Maryland, Baltimore County during the 2016–17 NCAA Division I women's basketball season. The Retrievers, led by 15th year head coach Phil Stern, played their home games in the Retriever Activities Center as members of the America East Conference. They finished the season 15–15, 10–6 in America East play to finish in third place. They lost in quarterfinals of the America East women's tournament to Hartford. They were invited to the Women's Basketball Invitational where they lost to Brown in the first round.

Media
All non-televised home games and conference road games will stream on either ESPN3 or AmericaEast.tv. Most road games will stream on the opponents website. Select games will be broadcast on the radio on WQLL-1370 AM.

Roster

Schedule

|-
!colspan=12 style="background:#000000; color:#ffb210;"| Non-conference regular season

|-
!colspan=12 style="background:#000000; color:#ffb210;"| America East regular season

|-
!colspan=12 style="background:#000000; color:#ffb210;"| America East Women's Tournament

|-
!colspan=12 style="background:#000000; color:#ffb210;"| WBI

See also
2015–16 UMBC Retrievers women's basketball team
2016–17 UMBC Retrievers men's basketball team

References

UMBC
UMBC Retrievers women's basketball seasons
UMBC
UMBC
UMBC